Coral Hills is an unincorporated area and census-designated place (CDP) in Prince George's County, Maryland, United States. As of the 2020 census, the population was 9,997.

Geography
Coral Hills is located at  (38.872312, −76.928010).

Demographics

2020 census

Note: the US Census treats Hispanic/Latino as an ethnic category. This table excludes Latinos from the racial categories and assigns them to a separate category. Hispanics/Latinos can be of any race.

2000 Census
As of the census of 2000, there were 10,720 people, 3,833 households, and 2,694 families residing in the CDP. The racial makeup of the CDP was 3.59% White, 93.56% African American, 0.49% Native American, 0.51% Asian, 0.05% Pacific Islander, 0.45% from other races, and 1.34% from two or more races. Hispanic or Latino of any race were 1.25% of the population.

There were 3,833 households, out of which 35.2% had children under the age of 18 living with them, 31.3% were married couples living together, 30.9% had a female householder with no husband present, and 29.7% were non-families. 23.9% of all households were made up of individuals, and 3.3% had someone living alone who was 65 years of age or older. The average household size was 2.80 and the average family size was 3.31.

In the CDP, the population was spread out, with 30.7% under the age of 18, 9.8% from 18 to 24, 31.1% from 25 to 44, 21.9% from 45 to 64, and 6.5% who were 65 years of age or older. The median age was 32 years. For every 100 females, there were 88.2 males. For every 100 females age 18 and over, there were 84.0 males.

The median income for a household in the CDP was $41,122, and the median income for a family was $45,288. Males had a median income of $30,799 versus $30,466 for females. The per capita income for the CDP was $17,876. About 9.2% of families and 12.1% of the population were below the poverty line, including 13.3% of those under age 18 and 11.8% of those age 65 or over.

Education
Coral Hills is a part of the Prince George's County Public Schools system.

Zoned elementary schools for the CDP are Bradbury Heights, Doswell Brooks, Concord, and William Hall. Zoned middle schools for the CDP are Drew-Freeman, William Hall, and Walker Mill. All residents are zoned to Suitland High School. William Hall was previously an elementary school but was scheduled to convert into being a K-8 in 2009.

John Edgar Howard Elementary was previously in Coral Hills CDP. It was scheduled to close in 2009. The facility is now used as the John E. Howard Community Center.

Parks and recreation
The Prince George's County Department of Parks and Recreation operates the John E. Howard Community Center, the former John E. Howard Elementary School. It includes an athletic field, a game room, a gymnasium, a playground, and a tennis court. It also has a kitchen, a multipurpose area, and a picnic facility with tables.

References

Census-designated places in Prince George's County, Maryland
Census-designated places in Maryland
Suburbs of Washington, D.C.